Doljevac is a small town and municipality located in the Nišava District of the southern Serbia. According to 2011 census, the municipality has 18,463 inhabitants, while the town has 1,657.

Geography
The municipality borders Merošina municipality and City of Niš in the north, Gadžin Han municipality in the east, Leskovac municipality in the south, and Žitorađa municipality in the west.

Demographics

According to the last official census done in 2011, the municipality of Doljevac has 18,463 inhabitants.

Ethnic groups
The ethnic composition of the municipality:

Economy
The following table gives a preview of total number of employed people per their core activity (as of 2017):

See also
 Nišava District
 Subdivisions of Serbia

References

External links

 

Populated places in Nišava District
Municipalities and cities of Southern and Eastern Serbia